The Maplewood Cemetery, formerly known as the New Pulaski Cemetery, is a historic cemetery in Pulaski, Tennessee, U.S..

History
The cemetery was established as the New Pulaski Cemetery in 1855. The oldest section, known as Old Maplewood, contains the burials of whites and blacks. In 1878, another section was added for African-American burials. The name was changed to Maplewood Cemetery in 1880. It was further expanded in 1907 and the 1940s.

The first person to be buried in Old Maplewood was Robert H. Watkins, a planter. The black burials are unmarked, while the white burials are often adorned with sculptures of angels and obelisks. There is a sub-section for the 85 veterans of the Confederate States Army buried there, including a monument dedicated by the United Daughters of the Confederacy in 1913. Other burials include Masons, and 40 veterans of the United States Colored Troops.

Notable burials include Confederate Generals John C. Brown (1827–1889) and John Adams (1825–1864), Confederate Colonel John Goff Ballentine (1825–1915), Confederate Congressmen Thomas McKissick Jones and James McCallum (1806–1889), and Thomas Martin (1799–1870), the founder of Martin Methodist College. Politicians Ross Bass (1918–1993), Edward Everett Eslick (1872–1932), Willa McCord Blake Eslick (1878–1961), and Lena Springs (1883–1942) are buried there as well.

Three of the original December 24, 1865 founders of the Ku Klux Klan in Pulaski, Tennessee are also buried here: John C. Lester (OM-141-2); James R. Crowe (OM-169-2), and; J. Calvin Jones (OM-164-10).

The cemetery has been listed on the National Register of Historic Places since November 15, 2005.

References

External links
 
 
 Maplewood Cemetery, Pulaski Tennessee Maplewood Cemetery, Pulaski, Giles County, Tennessee

Cemeteries on the National Register of Historic Places in Tennessee
Buildings and structures completed in 1855
Giles County, Tennessee
Cemeteries in Tennessee
Historic districts on the National Register of Historic Places in Tennessee
Confederate States of America cemeteries
1855 establishments in Tennessee